John Hogan was CEO and Chairmen of Clear Channel Radio until January 2014, when he retired. A 30-year radio veteran, he was responsible for the operations of nearly 1200 U.S. radio stations and nationally syndicated radio shows; including those of Rush Limbaugh, Ryan Seacrest, Casey Kasem, George Noory, Donald Trump, and Elvis Duran.

In 2007, Hogan was named Group Executive of the Year by Radio & Records magazine. Hogan was named second in the "40 Most Powerful People In Radio" list made by Radio Ink for 2009.

References

Year of birth missing (living people)
Living people
Businesspeople from San Antonio
American radio executives